Road Tapes, Venue #2 is a posthumous album of Frank Zappa, released in October 2013, consisting of songs from three concerts held in August 1973 at the Finlandia Hall, Helsinki, Finland: the  August 23 early & late shows and the August 24 show. With a duration of more than two hours, this collection gives the experience of a full concert. It is the eighth installment on the Vaulternative Records label that is dedicated to the posthumous release of complete Zappa concerts, following the releases of FZ:OZ (2002), Buffalo (2007), Wazoo (2007), Philly '76 (2009), Hammersmith Odeon (2010), Carnegie Hall (2011) and Road Tapes, Venue #1 (2012).

Track listing

Personnel 
 Frank Zappa – lead vocals, guitar
 Ruth Underwood – percussion
 Ralph Humphrey – drums, cowbells
 George Duke – keyboards, vocals
 Tom Fowler – electric bass
 Jean-Luc Ponty – violin
 Bruce Fowler – trombone
 Ian Underwood – bass clarinet, synthesizer

References

Frank Zappa live albums
2013 live albums
Live albums published posthumously
Sequel albums